Lelystad Airport  is an airport  south southeast of the city of Lelystad in Flevoland, Netherlands. It is the biggest general aviation airport in the Netherlands. The first flights were in 1971 and it became an official airport in 1973. Schiphol Group became owner of the airport in 1993. It is home to the aviation museum Aviodrome, which has a former KLM Boeing 747-200SUD on display. The airport serves Lelystad, the province of Flevoland and Amsterdam. The airport is the base of AIS Airlines, although they do not operate scheduled passenger flights from Lelystad Airport.

History 
In 1966 it was decided that the newly created Flevopolder required a central airport. A suitable location with room for future expansion was found to the south of Lelystad. The first flights from this location took place in 1971, but it was not until 1973 that it received official status as an airport.

At first Lelystad had grass taxi- and runways, but it was found that the clay could not support the traffic, as tracks started to form. Because of the often poor condition of the terrain, the airport suffered from frequent closure. To resolve this problem, in 1978 the first of the taxiways was hardened and in 1981 the runway was hardened.

In 1993 the Schiphol Group became the owner of the airport. The Aviodrome museum moved to Lelystad Airport from Schiphol in 2003. Local flying school AIS Flight Academy started an airline in 2009, AIS Airlines, and is still headquartered at Lelystad Airport, although they do not operate any scheduled flights from Lelystad.

Because of the museum, various aviation events are frequently held at the airport.

Expansion
An expansion of the airport is underway. The runway (05-23) is being extended to a total length of 2700 meters with a TORA of 2460 meters and an ASDA of 2700 meters, which is long enough to facilitate all aircraft of the Boeing 737 and Airbus A320 families and also is suitable for operations with wide bodies like the Boeing 787 and Airbus A350 although not at maximum take off weight. The ILS (instrument landing system) was tested in June 2018.  The new terminal will be built in phases, easily expandable when the airport grows. In 2018 the terminal building will be finished, capable of handling 25,000 flights per year. The building can be doubled on the RDW-location, capable of handling eventually up to 45,000 flights (7 - 8 million passengers per year). The same strategy is used for the airside apron with the aircraft stands, starting with 4 stands and ending up at 12 stands or more. The number of allowed aircraft movements is much discussed in the Netherlands and will start the first year of operation at only 4,000 per year, which means only around 11 movements daily. In 2021 and 2022, 7,000 and 10,000 flights respectively will be allowed.

The airport will have its own exit from the A6 motorway, which connects with Amsterdam, with travel times around 40–45 minutes when traffic allows. A public bus service also takes travelers to the Lelystad Centrum railway station, where trains run frequently in the direction of Amsterdam, Schiphol Airport and The Hague, Zwolle and Groningen.

A 10-year concession for all handling (landside and airside) is awarded to Viggo, a Dutch handling company.

The expansion of Lelystad Airport was driven by Amsterdam Airport Schiphol reaching its maximum 500,000 allowed aircraft movements.

References

External links

 
 Aviodrome, museum website 
 Airliners.net – photos taken at Lelystad Airport
 Information and artist's impression

Airports in Flevoland
Buildings and structures in Lelystad